Vitaliy Fedoriv (born 21 October 1987) is a Ukrainian professional footballer who plays as a defender for Metalist Kharkiv.

Club career
He was with FC Dynamo Kyiv from 2004 until 2009 and was first called up to the main squad in the 2006–07 season. His brother Volodymyr Fedoriv is also a professional football player.

Personal life
Fedoriv is a brother of Ukrainian football player Volodymyr Fedoriv (born 1985) and a stepbrother of another Ukrainian football player Rostyslav Rusyn (born 1995).

References

External links 
 
 
 

1987 births
Living people
Ukrainian footballers
Ukraine international footballers
Ukraine under-21 international footballers
Ukrainian expatriate footballers
Expatriate footballers in Russia
Expatriate footballers in Latvia
FC Dynamo Kyiv players
FC Dynamo-3 Kyiv players
FC Dynamo-2 Kyiv players
FC Amkar Perm players
FC Kryvbas Kryvyi Rih players
FK Spartaks Jūrmala players
FC Hoverla Uzhhorod players
FC Olimpik Donetsk players
FC Metalist Kharkiv players
Ukrainian Premier League players
Ukrainian First League players
Ukrainian Second League players
Russian Premier League players
Ukrainian expatriate sportspeople in Russia
Ukrainian expatriate sportspeople in Latvia
Association football defenders
FC Nizhny Novgorod (2015) players
Ukraine youth international footballers